Riyaz Ahmad Naikoo (also known as Mohammad bin Qasim or Zubair ul Islam, April 19856 May 2020) was one of the top ten most wanted militants of Jammu and Kashmir. He was a top commander of Hizbul Mujahideen, an Islamist Pro-Pakistan militant organization active in Indian-administered Jammu and Kashmir.

Early life and militant activities 
Naikoo was born in Beighpora, a village in Awantipora tehsil of the Pulwama district in the Kashmir Valley in April 1985. Some of his relatives have said that he had a passion for painting, especially roses, during his school and college days. After earning a degree in mathematics he became a math teacher at a nearby school. He gave free tuition to children from economically weaker backgrounds.

During the 2010 unrest, he was put under detention by the security forces cause he also allegedly involved to support Separatist Pro-Freedom militants & Protesters during the 2010 unrest. On 1 June 2012 he disappeared but after some days he resurfaced with a gun and he become a militant of Hizb-ul-Mujahideen. In 2017 he become the top commander (de facto chief) of Hizb-ul-Mujahideen in Jammu and Kashmir after the death of Burhan Wani and the defection of Zakir Musa.

In March 2014, he was involved in the killing of a Sarpanch's father Haji Ghulam Mohd Dar in Dogripora. He was also wanted for killing and abduction of police officers, murder, firing on a police bus and requirement in other crimes.

In 2018, police detained Naikoo's 70-year-old father. In retaliation, family members of police were kidnapped by militants from across south Kashmir. His father was soon released and the 11 hostages were accordingly let go by Naikoo. Jammu and Kashmir Police had alleged that he would "loot orchard owners". Naikoo started the practice of offering gun salutes to militants killed in encounters and posting them on social media. He was responsible for recruiting "scores of young Kashmiris in an armed quest for independence from India". Police say he rarely used mobiles, used a VPN when he had to, and was known to have used the Bat Messenger app to communicate. Naikoo's videos were circulated on the social media; one such video after the revocation of the special status of Jammu and Kashmir showed him saying that the revocation was "irrelevant to us" and the fight would continue. Naikoo carried a bounty of Rs 12 lakh on his head.

Naikoo's last audio message in April was related to the COVID-19 pandemic where he requested people to follow medical advice to keep themselves protected.

Encounter 
Naikoo was killed in an encounter with  21 Rashtriya Rifles and Jammu and Kashmir Police on 6 May 2020 in Beighpora. He was with an associate, who was also killed. The encounter was viewed as a victory for the security forces. Naikoo had been among the top 10 on the most-wanted list in Kashmir. As per policy, Naikoo's body was not handed back to his family. He was one of Kashmir's longest surviving militants (May 2012 to May 2020 or for 8 years).

As a precautionary measure to curb the spread of news, government authorities information imposed communications and information blackouts by barring internet and mobile services across Kashmir valley right after Naikoo's encounter. Protests against the killing of Naikoo were the first since August 2019, when the revocation of Kashmir's special status took place, with at least one protester dying and 50 seriously injured with bullet wounds to the chest and some with pellet injuries in one or both eyes. Syed Salahuddin, the head of Hizb-ul-Mujahideen, who is designated as a terrorist by India and the United States, said that "the sacrifice would help them achieve the mission that they had set out to achieve". On 10 May 2020 Saifullah, also known as Gazi Haider, replaced Riyaz Naikoo as the new operations commander.

See also 
 Insurgency in Jammu and Kashmir
 Hamid Gada
 Zakir Musa

References

Further reading 
 TOI Editorials blog (7 May 2020) Big strike for forces. But aim to prevent more Riyaz Naikoos from rising. The Times of India.
 Shishir Gupta (10 May 2020) Ajit Doval showers praise on Kashmir forces for Riyaz Naikoo Op, then stern advice. Hindustan Times.
 Anurag Sharma (15 May 2020) Kashmir: Another one Bites the Dust—HM Commander Naikoo Eliminated. VIF. Archived from the original on 21 May 2020.

1985 births
2020 deaths
Kashmiri people
Kashmiri Muslims
Kashmiri militants
21st-century Indian Muslims
Deaths by firearm in India
Kashmiri Islamists
Members of jihadist groups
People shot dead by law enforcement officers in India